Sungai Buloh is a federal constituency in Gombak District, Petaling District and Kuala Selangor District, Selangor, Malaysia, that has been represented in the Dewan Rakyat since 2018.

The federal constituency was created from parts of the Subang constituency in the 2018 redistribution and is mandated to return a single member to the Dewan Rakyat under the first past the post voting system.

Demographics

History

Polling districts 
According to the gazette issued on 31 October 2022, the Sungai Buloh constituency has a total of 28 polling districts.

Representation history

State constituency

Current state assembly members

Local governments

Election results

References

Selangor federal constituencies